Alan John "Jock" Marshall (17 February 1911 – 20 July 1967) was an Australian writer, academic and ornithologist.

Marshall was born in Redfern, New South Wales.  Despite having lost an arm in a shooting accident at the age of sixteen, he was active in several natural history expeditions, and had a distinguished service record during World War II in New Guinea, 1941–1945.  He was Reader in zoology and comparative anatomy at St Bartholomew's Medical College, University of London, 1949–1960, and foundation professor of zoology and comparative physiology, then Dean of Science, at Monash University 1960–1967.

He will be remembered by older generations of radio listeners as "Jock the Backyard Naturalist", a regular on the Argonauts Club until 1946.

Marshall died in Heidelberg, Victoria.  During his lifetime, he published numerous books and scientific papers and had been awarded the Royal Geographical Society's Back Award in 1948. He was elected a Fellow of the Royal Australasian Ornithologists Union in 1958.

Publications
Marshall, Alan John. (1937). The Black Musketeers. The Work and Adventures of a Scientist on a South Sea Island at War and in Peace. William Heinemann: London.
Marshall, Alan John. (1938). The Men and Birds of Paradise. Journeys through Equatorial New Guinea. William Heinemann: London.
Marshall, Alan John. (1942). Australia Limited. Angus & Robertson: Sydney.
Marshall, Alan John. (1954). Bower-birds, their displays and breeding cycles. A preliminary statement. Clarendon Press: Oxford, U.K.
Marshall, Alan John. (1970). Darwin and Huxley in Australia. Hodder & Stoughton: Sydney.
Marshall, Alan John. (Ed). (1966). The Great Extermination. A guide to Anglo-Australian Cupidity, Wickedness and Waste. Heinemann: Melbourne.
Marshall, Alan John; & Drysdale, Russell. (1966). Journey Among Men. Sun Books: Melbourne.

References

Robin, Libby. (2001). The Flight of the Emu: a hundred years of Australian ornithology 1901-2001. Carlton, Vic. Melbourne University Press.

External links
Jock Marshall: One Armed Warrior- Bright Sparcs Exhibition
McCarthy, Gavan; Manhal, Oscar; King, Bill; Swancott, Leigh; Scillio, Mark; Walker, Rosanne, Alan John (Jock) Marshall Guide to Records, Australian Science and Technology Heritage Centre, Melbourne, 2004

Australian ornithologists
Australian military personnel of World War II
1911 births
1967 deaths
Alumni of the Medical College of St Bartholomew's Hospital
Australian science writers
20th-century Australian zoologists